Kim Byong-joon (born 26 March 1954) is a former chief of staff (minister), Presidential Office of National Policies, Republic of Korea/ the Deputy Prime Minister and Minister of Education and Human Resources Development. He is designated Prime Minister of South Korea by President Park Geun-hye, on November 2, 2016, but Park withdrew her designate November 8.

Biography
Kim was born in Goryeong, Gyeongsangbuk-do.  He received his B.A degree from Yeungnam University in 1976, M.A degree from Hankuk University of Foreign Studies in 1979, and PhD degree from University of Delaware in 1984.

References

External links
 Profile of Kim Byong-joon

1954 births
South Korean academics
Living people
People from Suwon
Education ministers of South Korea
Deputy Prime Ministers of South Korea
University of Delaware alumni
Hankuk University of Foreign Studies alumni
Yeungnam University alumni
South Korean Buddhists
Academic staff of Kookmin University